Carolina Meadows is a planned community and census-designated place (CDP) in Chatham County, North Carolina, United States. It was first listed as a CDP in the 2020 census with a population of 727.

The CDP is bordered to the north by Orange County and Durham County. State Road 1726 (Old Farrington Road) forms the southeastern border of the community, and State Route 1727 (Whippoorwill Lane) is the southwestern border. The Governors Village CDP is to the southwest, across Whippoorwill Lane.

Demographics

2020 census

Note: the US Census treats Hispanic/Latino as an ethnic category. This table excludes Latinos from the racial categories and assigns them to a separate category. Hispanics/Latinos can be of any race.

References 

Census-designated places in Chatham County, North Carolina
Census-designated places in North Carolina